San Jacinto River may refer to:

San Jacinto River (California)
San Jacinto River (Texas)